François Clémencin (7 October 1878 – 6 March 1950) was a French sculptor. His work was part of the sculpture event in the art competition at the 1932 Summer Olympics.

References

External links
 

1878 births
1950 deaths
20th-century French sculptors
French male sculptors
Olympic competitors in art competitions
Sculptors from Lyon